The Lavie was a French automobile manufactured in Paris around 1904.  The company produced a few 6cv twin-cylinder voiturettes; one is reported to survive.

References

Defunct motor vehicle manufacturers of France